Rhododendron wrayi is a species of flowering plant in the family Ericaceae, endemic to Peninsular Malaysia.

References

wrayi
Endemic flora of Peninsular Malaysia
Least concern plants
Taxonomy articles created by Polbot